Widdringtonia wallichii,  Clanwilliam cedar or Clanwilliam cypress, previously Widdringtonia cedarbergensis is a species of Widdringtonia native to South Africa, where it is endemic to the Cederberg Mountains northeast of Cape Town in Western Cape Province. It is threatened by habitat loss and protected in South Africa under the National Forest Act (Act 84) of 1998.

It is a small evergreen tree growing to 5–7 m (rarely to 20 m) tall. The leaves are scale-like, 1.5 mm long and 1 mm broad on small shoots, up to 15 mm long on strong-growing shoots, and arranged in opposite decussate pairs. The cones are globose to rectangular, 2–3 cm long, with four scales.

Chemical constituents
The essential oil derived from leaves contains terpinen-4-ol (36.0%), sabinene (19.2%), γ-terpinene (10.4%), α-terpinene (5.5%) and myrcene (5.5%). The wood oil contains thujopsene (47.1%), α-cedrol (10.7%), widdrol (8.5%) and cuparene (4.0%).

References

Afromontane flora
wallichii
Trees of South Africa
Protected trees of South Africa
Endangered plants
Taxonomy articles created by Polbot
Taxobox binomials not recognized by IUCN 
Taxa named by Élie-Abel Carrière